James Cairns was a footballer who played at inside right for several English clubs, including Lincoln City and Newton Heath in the late 1890s.

Cairns began his football career with Stevenston Thistle in 1895, before moving to Glossop North End. In September 1897, he joined Football League side Lincoln City, but before he made an appearance for the club, he had moved on to Newton Heath in April 1898. It took Cairns six months to make his debut for the Heathens, eventually playing at inside right in a 2–1 home win over Burslem Port Vale on 8 October 1898. It would turn out to be his only appearance for Newton Heath, however, and he joined Berry's Association in November 1898 before retiring from football.

External links
Profile at StretfordEnd.co.uk
Profile at MUFCInfo.com

Association football forwards
Glossop North End A.F.C. players
Lincoln City F.C. players
Manchester United F.C. players
Year of death missing
Year of birth missing
English footballers